The 1938 FIFA World Cup was the third edition of the World Cup, the quadrennial international football championship for senior men's national teams and was held in France from 4 June until 19 June 1938. Italy defended its title in the final, beating Hungary 4–2. Italy's 1934 and 1938 teams hold the distinction of being the only men's national team to win the World Cup multiple times under the same coach, Vittorio Pozzo. It would be the last World Cup until 1950 due to World War II.

Host selection 

France was chosen as host nation by FIFA in Berlin on 13 August 1936. France was chosen over Argentina and Germany in the first round of voting. The decision to hold a second consecutive tournament in Europe (after Italy in 1934) caused outrage in South America, where it was believed that the venue should alternate between the two continents. This was the last World Cup to be staged before the outbreak of the Second World War.

Qualification 

Because of anger over the decision to hold a second successive World Cup in Europe, Uruguay and Argentina refused to enter the competition. Spain meanwhile could not participate due to the ongoing Spanish Civil War.

It was the first time that the hosts, France, and the title holders, Italy, qualified automatically. Title holders were given an automatic entry into the World Cup from 1938 until 2002 (inclusive), since abolished.

Of the 14 remaining places, eleven were allocated to Europe, two to the Americas, and one to Asia. As a result, only three non-European nations took part: Brazil, Cuba and the Dutch East Indies. This is the smallest ever number of teams from outside the host continent to compete at a FIFA World Cup.

Austria qualified for the World Cup, but after qualification was complete, the Anschluss united Austria with Germany. Austria subsequently withdrew from the tournament, with some Austrian players joining the German squad, although not including Austrian star player Matthias Sindelar, who refused to play for the unified team. Latvia was the runner-up in Austria's qualification group, but was not invited to participate; instead Austria's place remained empty, and Sweden, which would have been Austria's initial opponent, progressed directly to the second-round by default.

This tournament saw the first, and  the only, participation in a World Cup tournament from Cuba and the Dutch East Indies (now Indonesia). It also saw the World Cup debuts of Poland and Norway. Romania would not qualify for another World Cup until 1970, Poland and the Netherlands would not reappear at a finals tournament until 1974, and Norway would not qualify for another World Cup finals until 1994. A unified Germany team would not appear again until 1994, although Austria returned in 1954 and won third place.

List of qualified teams

The following 16 teams originally qualified for the final tournament. However, 15 teams participated after Austria's withdrawal due to the Anschluss.

  Austria (withdrew)
  
  
  
  
  
  (hosts)
  

  
  (1934 champions)

Format 
The knockout format from 1934 was retained. If a match was tied after 90 minutes, then 30 minutes of extra time were played. If the score was still tied after extra time, the match would be replayed. This was the last World Cup tournament that used a straight knockout format.

Summary 

Germany, France, Italy, Czechoslovakia, Hungary, Cuba and Brazil were seeded for the draw taking place in Paris, on 5 March 1938. Sweden was given a bye due to Austria's withdrawal.

Five of the seven first round matches required extra time to break the deadlock; two games still went to a replay. In one replay, Cuba advanced to the next round at the expense of Romania. In the other replay, Germany, which had led 1–0 in the first game against Switzerland, led 2–0 but eventually was beaten 2–4. This loss, which took place in front of a hostile, bottle-throwing crowd in Paris, was blamed by German coach Sepp Herberger on a defeatist attitude from the five Austrian players he had been forced to include; a German journalist later commented that "Germans and Austrians prefer to play against each other even when they're in the same team". Until they were knocked out in the first round in 2018, this was the only time Germany had failed to advance past the first round.

Sweden advanced directly to the quarter-finals as a result of Austria's withdrawal, and they proceeded to beat Cuba 8–0. The hosts, France, were beaten by the holders, Italy, and Switzerland were seen off by Hungary. Czechoslovakia took Brazil to extra time in a notoriously feisty match in Bordeaux before succumbing in a replay; the South Americans proved too strong for the depleted Czechoslovak side (both Oldřich Nejedlý and František Plánička had suffered broken bones in the first game) and won 2–1. This was the last match to be replayed in a World Cup.

Hungary destroyed Sweden in one of the semi-finals 5–1, while Italy and Brazil had the first of their many important World Cup clashes in the other. The Brazilians were without their star player Leônidas, who was injured, and the Italians won 2–1. Brazil topped Sweden 4–2 for third place.

Rumour has it, before the finals Benito Mussolini was to have sent a telegram to the team, saying "Vincere o morire!" (literally translated as "Win or die!"). This should not have been meant as a literal threat, but instead just an encouragement to win. However, no record remains of such a telegram, and World Cup player Pietro Rava said, when interviewed, "No, no, no, that's not true. He sent a telegram wishing us well, but no never 'win or die'."

The final itself took place at the Stade Olympique de Colombes in Paris. Vittorio Pozzo's Italian side took the lead early, but Hungary equalised within two minutes. The Italians took the lead again shortly after, and by the end of the first half were leading the Hungarians 3–1. Hungary never really got back into the game. With the final score favouring the Italians 4–2, Italy became the first team to successfully defend the title and were once more crowned World Cup winners.

Because of World War II, the World Cup would not be held for another 12 years, until 1950. As a result, Italy were the reigning World Cup holders for a record 16 years, from 1934 to 1950. The Italian Vice-president of FIFA, Dr. Ottorino Barassi, hid the trophy in a shoe-box under his bed throughout the Second World War and thus saved it from falling into the hands of occupying troops.

Venues 
Eleven venues in ten cities were planned to host the tournament; of these, all hosted matches except the Stade de Gerland in Lyon, which did not due to Austria's withdrawal.

Squads 
For a list of all squads that appeared in the final tournament, see 1938 FIFA World Cup squads.

Final tournament

Bracket

Round of 16

Replays

Quarter-finals

Replay

Semi-finals

Third place play-off

Final

Goalscorers 
With seven goals, Leônidas was the top scorer in the tournament. In total, 84 goals were scored by 42 players, with two of them credited as own goals.

7 goals

  Leônidas

5 goals
  György Sárosi
  Gyula Zsengellér
  Silvio Piola

4 goals
  Gino Colaussi
  Ernest Wilimowski

3 goals

  Perácio
  Romeu
  Héctor Socorro
  Harry Andersson
  Arne Nyberg
  Gustav Wetterström
  André Abegglen

2 goals
  Oldřich Nejedlý
  Jean Nicolas
  Pál Titkos
  Ștefan Dobay

1 goal

  Henri Isemborghs
  Roberto
  Tomás Fernández
  José Magriñá
  Vlastimil Kopecký
  Josef Košťálek
  Josef Zeman
  Oscar Heisserer
  Émile Veinante
  Josef Gauchel
  Wilhelm Hahnemann
  Vilmos Kohut
  Géza Toldi
  Pietro Ferraris
  Giuseppe Meazza
  Arne Brustad
  Fryderyk Scherfke
  Iuliu Barátky
  Silviu Bindea
  Tore Keller
  Sven Jonasson
  Alfred Bickel
  Eugen Walaschek

1 own goal
  Sven Jacobsson (playing against Hungary)
  Ernst Lörtscher (playing against Germany)

FIFA retrospective ranking 

In 1986, FIFA published a report that ranked all teams in each World Cup up to and including 1986, based on progress in the competition, overall results and quality of the opposition. The rankings for the 1938 tournament were as follows:

Footnotes

References

External links

1938 FIFA World Cup at FIFA.com
1938 FIFA World Cup at RSSSF.com

 
FIFA World Cup tournaments
International association football competitions hosted by France
World
World
International sports boycotts
June 1938 sports events